Cannon Creek is a rural locality in the Southern Downs Region, Queensland, Australia.

History 
Cannon Creek Provisional School  opened on 6 January 1911. On 1 October 1913 it became Cannon Creek State School.  It closed on 1945. It was located at 611 Cannon Creek Road, now within the locality of Bapaume.

References 

Southern Downs Region
Localities in Queensland